is a Japanese singer-songwriter and record producer. He is best known for his work as a record producer for acts including Misia, Chara, and Yuki Koyanagi. Sasaki also works as a photographer under the alias of Yajimax. In 2005, Sasaki married musician and actress Kaori Hifumi.

External links

Jun Sasaki on Myspace

1966 births
Japanese composers
Japanese male composers
Japanese record producers
Living people
Musicians from Miyagi Prefecture
People from Sendai